Phyllophaga parvidens is a species of scarab beetle in the family Scarabaeidae. It is found in North America.

Subspecies
These two subspecies belong to the species Phyllophaga parvidens:
 Phyllophaga parvidens hysteropyga Davis, 1920
 Phyllophaga parvidens parvidens (LeConte, 1856)

References

Further reading

 

Melolonthinae
Articles created by Qbugbot
Beetles described in 1856
Taxa named by John Lawrence LeConte